Joseph Eghonghon Edionwele is a politician and member of the 8th and 9th Assembly representing Esan Central/Esan West/Igueben Federal Constituency, Edo State. He is popularly known as Joe Edionwele.

Early life and education 
Hon. (Chief) Joe was born January 31, 1960, to the family of Late Pa. Edionwele of Idumun-ogo Iruekpen, Ekpoma, Esan West Local Government Area, Edo State, Nigeria. Hon. Edionwele attended St. Paul Anglican Primary School Iruekpen (1966 – 1972), Ujoelen Grammar School, Ekpoma, from 1973 – 1978. He proceeded to Auchi Federal Polytechnic, Auchi, where he obtained Higher National Diploma (HND) in Accounting, in 1985.

Career 
Hon. Edionwele briefly worked as a teaching assistant at Ujoelen Grammar School after his secondary education before proceeding to further his education. After graduation, he was posted to Abia State for his mandatory National Youth Service in 1985/1986.

Upon completion of his national youth service, he worked with Union Bank of Nigeria before gaining employment to work with Nigeria Institute for Oil Palm Research (NIFOR), Edo State. At NIFOR, he rose to the position of a chief accountant before resigning to pursue his political career.

Politics 
In 1999, Hon. Edionwele contested and won the election for the position of a Local Government Chairman of Esan West Local Government under the platform of the People’s Democratic Party (PDP) (1999 – 2002). Subsequently, in 2003, he was appointed a member of the Edo State Local Government Service Commission. He served in various capacities: a member of the Board of the National Orthopedic Hospital, Enugu and the Secretary of South-South People’s Democratic Party, PDP.

In 2015 Hon. Edionwele contested for the position of House of Representatives member and won, he was returned to the National Assembly in 2019 General Election under the platform of the Peoples Democratic Party, PDP

Personal life 
Hon. Joe Edionwele is married to Chief (Mrs.) Patricia Edionwele. They have several children.

References 

Living people
1960 births
21st-century Nigerian politicians
People from Edo State